Francis 'Mkhulu' Banda is a Zambian professional football manager.

Career
Since 1998 until 2000 he coached the Swaziland national football team. After resignation of Mlanda Dlamini in September 2003 he was an interim coach of Swaziland national team until October 2003. In 2005, he again coached Swaziland national team. In 2011, he worked as a head coach of Green Mamba FC.

References

External links

Year of birth missing (living people)
Living people
Zambian football managers
Eswatini national football team managers
Expatriate football managers in Eswatini
Place of birth missing (living people)
Zambian expatriate sportspeople in Eswatini
Zambian expatriate football managers